Tandem repeats occur in DNA when a pattern of one or more nucleotides is repeated and the repetitions are directly adjacent to each other. Several protein domains also form tandem repeats within their amino acid primary structure, such as armadillo repeats. However, in proteins, perfect tandem repeats are unlikely in most in vivo proteins, and most known repeats are in proteins which have been designed.

An example would be:
 ATTCG ATTCG ATTCG

in which the sequence ATTCG is repeated three times.

Terminology
When between 10 and 60 nucleotides are repeated, it is called a minisatellite. Those with fewer are known as microsatellites or short tandem repeats.

When exactly two nucleotides are repeated, it is called a dinucleotide repeat (for example: ACACACAC...). The microsatellite instability in hereditary nonpolyposis colon cancer most commonly affects such regions.

When three nucleotides are repeated, it is called a trinucleotide repeat (for example: CAGCAGCAGCAG...), and abnormalities in such regions can give rise to trinucleotide repeat disorders.

When the repeat unit copy number is variable in the population being considered, it is called a variable number tandem repeat (VNTR). MeSH classifies variable number tandem repeats under minisatellites.

Mechanism

Tandem repeats can occur through different mechanisms. For example, slipped strand mispairing (SSM), (also known as replication slippage), is a mutation process which occurs during DNA replication. It involves denaturation and displacement of the DNA strands, resulting in mispairing of the complementary bases. Slipped strand mispairing is one explanation for the origin and evolution of repetitive DNA sequences.

Other mechanisms include unequal crossover and gene conversion.

Uses
Tandem repeat describes a pattern that helps determine an individual's inherited traits.

Tandem repeats can be very useful in determining parentage. Short tandem repeats are used for certain genealogical DNA tests. DNA is examined from microsatellites within the chromosomal DNA.  Parentage can be determined through the similarity in these regions.

Polymorphic tandem repeats (alias VNTRs) are also present in microorganisms and can be used to trace the origin of an outbreak. The corresponding assay in which a collection of VNTRs is typed to characterize a strain is most often called MLVA (Multiple Loci VNTR Analysis).

In the field of computer science, tandem repeats in strings (e.g., DNA sequences) can be efficiently detected using suffix trees or suffix arrays.

Studies in 2004 linked the unusual genetic plasticity of dogs to mutations in tandem repeats.

Nested tandem repeats are described as repeating unit lengths that are variable or unknown and frequently include an asymmetric hierarchy of smaller repeating units. These repeats are constructed from distinct groups of homologous-length monomers. An algorithm known as NTRprism was created by Oxford Nanopore Technologies researchers to enable for the annotation of repetitive structures in built satellite DNA arrays. The algorithm NTRprism is developed to find and display the satellite repeating periodicity.

See also
 Microsatellite
 Minisatellite
 ProRepeat
 Satellite DNA
 Tandem Repeats Database
 Tandem repeat locus
 Variable number tandem repeats

References

External links 
Examples: 
 VNTRs - info and animated example
Databases:
 TRDB - The Tandem Repeats Database 
   The Microorganisms Tandem Repeats Database
 Short Tandem Repeats Database
 Tandem Repeats in major genomes 
Search tools:
TAPO: A combined method for the identification of tandem repeats in protein structures
 Tandem Repeats Finder 
 Mreps
 STAR
 Splinter
 TRED - Tandem Repeats over the Edit Distance
 TandemSWAN 
   Microsatellite repeats finder
 JSTRING - Java Search for Tandem Repeats in genomes
 Phobos - a tandem repeat search tool for perfect and imperfect repeats - the maximum pattern size depends only on computational power
 UGENE  - an ultra fast and memory efficient open-source tandem repeats finder implementation.
TRAL: Tandem Repeat Annotation Library - a meta-predictor tool with statistical filtering, with a range of functions for repeat annotation and analyses

Repetitive DNA sequences

de:Tandemwiederholung